Heinrich Beck may refer to:
 Heinrich Beck (actor) (1760–1803), German actor
 Heinrich Beck (brewer) (1832–1882), German brewer, founder of Beck's Brewery
 Heinrich Beck (philologist) (1929–2019), German professor
 Heinrich Beck (publisher) (1853–1914), German publisher, see Egon Friedell